Thomas Pickering (c. 1621 – 9 May 1679) was a Benedictine lay brother who served in England during the time of recusancy in the late seventeenth century. He was martyred as a result of the fraudulent claims of Titus Oates that he was part of a plot to murder King Charles II. 

Born in Westmorland, England, Pickering entered the Benedictine Abbey of St. Gregory the Great at Douai in Somerset) and made his vows as in 1660.

Popish Plot

In 1665, he was sent to London to be steward for the Benedictine monks who served the chapel of Catherine of Braganza, the Catholic wife of King Charles II. There he became known personally to the Queen and Charles II; and when in 1675, urged by the Parliament, Charles issued a proclamation ordering the Benedictines to leave England within a fixed time, Pickering was allowed to remain, probably on the grounds that he was not a Catholic priest.

In 1678, Titus Oates made false claims of a Catholic plot against the King's life, and Pickering was accused of being part of this conspiracy, which is popularly known as the Popish Plot. At his trial on 17 December 1678, no evidence of treason against Pickering except Oates's mere word was produced, and Pickering's housekeeper, the formidable Ellen Rigby, later testified that Oates had only seen Pickering once in his life, when he had been begging for alms at the Benedictine's London house in the summer of 1678. She also testified that he had a personal grudge against Pickering, who, despite his habitual charity and good temper, told her "never to let that man come in again". Pickering's innocence was so obvious that the Queen publicly announced her belief in him, saying that she could not accept that he was a risk to the royal family: "I should have more fear to be alone in my chamber with a mouse". Nonetheless, the jury, under heavy pressure from William Scroggs, the Lord Chief Justice, who was a convinced believer in the Popish Plot, found him guilty, and with William Ireland and John Grove he was condemned to be hanged, drawn, and quartered.

Execution
The King, who himself had Catholic leanings, was torn between his reluctance to execute three men whom he knew to be innocent (Ireland's innocence was even more obvious than Pickering's since he had a cast-iron alibi, which the prosecution never succeeded in breaking), and his fear of the popular clamour, as the public loudly demanded the death of Oates's victims. Twice within a month, the three prisoners were ordered to prepare for execution and then reprieved. The King pointedly asked when his subjects had ever previously had cause to complain of his reluctance to shed blood: this was undoubtedly a reference to the notable clemency which he had shown to his political enemies in the Indemnity and Oblivion Act 1660. At length Charles, although only with great reluctance, ordered the execution of Ireland and Grove, hoping that this would satisfy public opinion and save Pickering from his fate. However, on 26 April 1679, the House of Commons petitioned for Pickering's execution. Charles yielded, and on 9 May 1679, Pickering was hanged, drawn and quartered at Tyburn with Ambrose Mac-Fall, George Terpitsas and the Benedictine George Gervase.

Pickering was one of the 107 martyrs beatified by Pope Pius XI on 15 December 1929. In character, he was described as the most charitable and sweet-tempered of men.

References

 Bede Camm (1931) Nine Martyr Monks, pp. 344–348.
Kenyon, J. P. The Popish Plot, Phoenix Press reissue 2000

People executed by Stuart England by hanging, drawing and quartering
English Benedictines
1620s births
1679 deaths
Victims of the Popish Plot
English beatified people
17th-century Roman Catholic martyrs
17th-century venerated Christians
People from Westmorland
Executed people from Cumbria
One Hundred and Seven Martyrs of England and Wales